The Bentley B.R.2 was a nine-cylinder British rotary aircraft engine developed during the First World War by the motor car engine designer W. O. Bentley from his earlier Bentley BR.1. Coming as it did near the end of the war, the BR.2 was built in smaller numbers than the earlier BR.1 – its main use being by the Royal Air Force in the early 1920s.

Design and development

This was the last type of rotary engine to be adopted by the RAF – later air-cooled aircraft engines such as the Cosmos Jupiter and Armstrong Siddeley Jaguar being almost entirely of the fixed radial type. With the BR.2, the rotary engine had reached a point beyond which this type of engine could not be further developed, due to its inherent limitations.

Applications
The type selected as the standard single-seat fighter of the post-war RAF, the Sopwith Snipe, had been designed around the BR.2, as had its ground attack version, the Sopwith TF.2 Salamander. A number of other experimental and minor production types were either designed for, or otherwise fitted with this power plant during the late "war" years and into the early 1920s.

 Armstrong Whitworth Armadillo
 Austin Osprey
 Boulton Paul Bobolink
 Brennan Helicopter
 Gloster Grouse
 Gloster Nightjar
 Gloster Sparrowhawk
 Grain Griffin
 Handley Page Type S
 Nieuport Nightjar
 Parnall Panther
 Sopwith Buffalo
 Sopwith Gnu
 Sopwith Salamander
 Sopwith Snipe
 Vickers Vampire

Variants
BR.2 230
1918, 230 hp.
BR.2 245 
1918, 245 hp.

Engines on display
A Bentley BR.2 is on public display in the Science Museum (London), another forms part of the aero engine collection at the Royal Air Force Museum Cosford. Another one (serial number 40543, manufactured by Gwynnes) is in the National Military Museum, Romania.

The sole operational BR.2 is mounted in Fantasy of Flight's replica of the Sopwith Snipe.

A ¼ scale working replica of the Bentley BR.2 World War I rotary aero engine built by Lewis Kinleside Blackmore is currently on display at the Bentley Memorial Building in Oxfordshire, UK. This was the first model built of this engine and is the subject also of a book by L K Blackmore.

The Canada Aviation and Space Museum in Ottawa, Ontario, Canada has a BR.2 installed in their Sopwith 7F.1 Snipe.

Specifications (BR.2)

See also

References

Notes

Bibliography

 
 Gunston, Bill. World Encyclopedia of Aero Engines. Cambridge, England. Patrick Stephens Limited, 1989. 
Jane's Fighting Aircraft of World War I. London. Studio Editions Ltd, 1993. 
 Lumsden, Alec. British Piston Engines and their Aircraft. Marlborough, Wiltshire: Airlife Publishing, 2003. .

External links

 National Museum of the USAF - BR.2 fact sheet

Rotary aircraft piston engines
Air-cooled aircraft piston engines
1910s aircraft piston engines